Ellie Victoria Cole,  (born 12 December 1991) is an Australian retired Paralympic swimmer and wheelchair basketball player. After having her leg amputated due to cancer, she trained in swimming as part of her rehabilitation program and progressed more rapidly than instructors had predicted. She began competitive swimming in 2003 and first competed internationally at the 2006 IPC Swimming World Championships, where she won a silver medal. Since then, she has won medals in the Pan Pacific Swimming Championships, the Commonwealth Games, the Paralympic Games, the IPC Swimming World Championships, and various national championships. Following the 2012 London Paralympics, where she won four gold and two bronze medals, Cole underwent two shoulder reconstructions and made a successful return to swimming at the 2015 IPC Swimming World Championships, winning five medals, including three golds. She subsequently represented Australia at the 2016 Rio de Janeiro Paralympics, the 2018 Commonwealth Games, and the 2020 Tokyo Paralympics. In claiming her seventeenth Paralympic medal in Tokyo, Cole became Australia's most decorated female Paralympian with six gold, five silver and six bronze medals from four Paralympic Games.

Personal life
Ellie Victoria Cole was born in Lilydale, Victoria, on 12 December 1991. Her mother and grandfather were both swimmers, and her father was athletic. At two years of age, she was diagnosed with a rare tumour, a neurosarcoma that was wrapped around the nerves of her right leg. After unsuccessful attempts to treat her cancer with chemotherapy, her right leg was amputated above the knee on 14 February 1994. Eight weeks after the surgery, as part of her rehabilitation, Cole's mother Jenny enrolled her in swimming lessons. Cole's instructors expected her to take up to a year to learn how to swim in a straight line, but it took her two weeks.

Cole attended Mount Eliza North Primary school and Frankston High School, both in the outer Melbourne suburb of Frankston. As of 2021 she lives in Sydney and trains at the Knox Pymble Swim Club. She has completed a Bachelor in Health and Exercise Science at the Australian Catholic University.

Cole was featured in the 2020 documentary film Rising Phoenix on Netflix , which focused on the Paralympic Games. She also campaigns for #WeThe15, a global human rights movement for disabled people.

Cole announced her retirement from swimming at the August 2022 Duel in the Pool.

Swimming
Cole is classified in the S9 category in swimming due to her amputation, a classification that also includes swimmers who have joint restrictions in one leg and those with double below-knee amputations. She began competitive swimming in 2003 and, at the 2006 IPC Swimming World Championships in Durban, she won a silver medal in the women's 100m backstroke S9 event. Also in 2006 Cole won the 100m backstroke at the Telstra Australian Swimming Championships. Cole qualified for the Australian Paralympic Swim Team in 2008 and, in the same year, attended the Beijing Paralympics where she won a silver medal in the Women's 100m Butterfly S9 event and bronze medals in the 400m Freestyle and 100m Backstroke events.

On 12 August 2009 Cole participated in the 100m freestyle multi-disability event in the 2009 Australian Short Course Swimming Championships in Hobart, where she broke the world record with a time of 1:04:06. This championship is the qualifying event for the IPC Swimming World Championships, run by FINA, the international organization for swimming. The same year Cole participated in the 2009 IPC Swimming World Championships 25 m in Rio de Janeiro, where she won bronze medals in the 100m backstroke, 400m freestyle, 4 × 100m freestyle relay and the 200m individual medley.

In 2010 at the IPC Swimming World Championships in Eindhoven, Netherlands she won bronze medals in the women's 200m individual medley and 400m freestyle S9 events. In that same year she won bronze medals in the 100m Freestyle S9 and 100m Butterfly S9 events at the 2010 Commonwealth Games in New Delhi. At the 2011 Pan Pacific Swimming Championships in Edmonton, Alberta, Canada she won a total of six gold medals, emerging victorious in the women's 50m freestyle, 100m freestyle, 400m freestyle, 100m butterfly, 100m backstroke and 200m individual medley S9 events. Cole has also participated in national championships such as the Australian Age Multi Class Swimming Championships and the New South Wales State Open championships. The former competition is held in Canberra at the Australian Institute of Sport and is designed to prepare elite swimmers for international competition. She then participated in the 2012 New South Wales State Open Championships in multi-class events.

Cole was an Australian Institute of Sport Scholarship holder. Her coach, Graeme Carroll, trained her in Canberra in preparation for the 2012 London Paralympics with an approach that combined swim training with aerobics and gym work. She trained with Teigan Van Roosmalen, a blind and deaf S13 swimmer. Cole also mentors young athletes. When not in high school Cole was undertaking ten or more swimming sessions a week but, while at school, she reduced her load. As of 2021, her coach is Nick Dobson.

At the 2012 London Paralympics, Cole participated in eight events and won six medals. In her first event, the 100 m Butterfly S9, she finished fourth, while South Africa's Natalie du Toit finished first. However, the following night, Cole won the 100 m Backstroke S9, winning her first gold medal of the games in Australian record time. She told the press that it had "been a goal of mine ever since I was 12 years old to beat Natalie du Toit" who was "kind of like the Michael Phelps of swimming for me, she has been a great mentor and relaxes me in the marshalling room. She is my biggest hero." Cole won a second gold medal in the 4 x 100 m freestyle relay 34 pts, this time in World Record time. In the 400 m Freestyle S9, she was again beaten by du Toit, who finished first, while Cole took bronze. Cole won a second bronze in the 50 m Freestyle S9, in which du Toit finished seventh, and then gold in the 100 m Freestyle S9, in which du Toit finished third. Cole capped off the games, surprising even herself with a fourth gold medal, in the 4 x 100 m freestyle relay 34 pts, again in Australian record time.

After the London Paralympics, she underwent two shoulder reconstructions that threatened her swimming career. At the 2015 IPC Swimming World Championships, she won gold medals in the Women's 100 m Backstroke S9 breaking the world record in the heats and final, Women's 100 m Freestyle S9 and Women's 4 x 100 m Freestyle Relay 34 points, a silver medal in the Women's 4 × 100 m Medley Relay and a bronze medal in the Women's 50 m Freestyle S9 .

Cole became the first S9 swimmer to break 29 seconds in the 50m freestyle in winning the gold medal at the 2016 Australian Swimming Championships in Adelaide in the 50m Freestyle Multiclass event. Her time of  28.75 broke Natalie du Toit's world record of 29.04.

At the 2016 Rio Paralymmpics, Cole won two gold medals in the Women's 100 m backstroke S9 and  Women's 4 x 100 Freestyle Relay 34 points, three silver medals in the Women's 50 m and 400m Freestyle S9, Women's 4 x 100 Medley Relay 34 points and the bronze medal in the Women's 100m Freestyle S9. Cole alongside Maddison Elliott, Lakeisha Patterson and Ashleigh McConnell broke the world record for the Women's 4 × 100 m Freestyle Relay 34 Points with a time of 4.16.65.

Cole faced a challenging time in the lead-up to Rio Paralympics. She reflects "I was still questioning if I was worthy to be there heading in – and I knew that I was, but it's amazing that even after the amount of psychological sports training that I've had, those thoughts still come in and take you down... Usually the athletes who win are the ones who can put those thoughts aside, and tell themselves that they've got a good crack at winning." Meanwhile, Cole put those thoughts aside and went on to win 6 medals at Rio.

At the 2019 World Para Swimming Championships, London, she won the silver medal in the Women's 100m Backstroke S9 and bronze medal in the Women's 400m Freestyle S9.

At the 2020 Tokyo Paralympics, Cole, together with her team of Emily Beecroft, Isabella Vincent, and Ashleigh McConnell won a silver medal in the Women's 4x100m Freestyle 34 pts with a time of 4:26.82, two seconds behind the winners, Italy. She also won a bronze medal in the 34pts Women's 4x100m Medley 34 pts. Her team of Emily Beecroft, Keira Stephens and Isabella Vincent clocked 4:55.70. In claiming the medley bronze, Cole's seventeenth Paralympic medal, she became Australia's most decorated female Paralympian, surpassing the previous record held by swimmer Priya Cooper. Cole also competed in the 100 m freestyle S9, the 400 m freestyle S9, and the 100 m backstroke S9. She qualified for the finals in each but failed to win a medal.

At the 2022 Commonwealth Games, Birmingham, England, she finished 5th in the Women's 100 m freestyle S9.

Wheelchair basketball

Cole played wheelchair basketball for Victoria in the Women's National Wheelchair Basketball League in 2013 and 2014 as a 4.0 point player, taking out the league's award for Best New Talent in 2013.

"I loved working in a team because swimming isn't considered a team sport," Cole told an interviewer in 2013. "I definitely wanted a new challenge, when you've been competing for a decade the increments of improvements are quite small. However, in wheelchair basketball I knew that I could make big improvements. I've been chosen for the women's national league team, which is great, so I'm actually getting somewhere, which is a surprise. But my heart is definitely in swimming and I think it always will be."

Recognition
During her time at Frankston High School, Cole received a Debbie Flintoff-King award for the most outstanding sporting achievement from the institution three years in a row; she was also nominated for the Junior Paralympian of the Year award. The award was received for winning silver and two bronze medals in the Beijing Paralympic Games, silver in 100m butterfly and bronze in 100m backstroke and 400m freestyle. In 2009, she received an Outstanding Sporting Achievement Award from the Department of Education and Early Childhood Development. In 2011, she was nominated for The Age's Sport Performer Award in the Performer with a Disability category. In August of the same year she was voted International Paralympic Committee Athlete of the Month after winning six gold medals in Edmonton. She was awarded the Medal of the Order of Australia in the 2014 Australia Day Honours "for service to sport as a Gold Medallist at the London 2012 Paralympic Games." In November 2015, she was awarded Cosmopolitan Magazine's 2015 Sportswoman of the Year.

Cole was the flag bearer for Australia at the 2020 Tokyo Paralympic Games Closing Ceremony. In 2022, she was awarded Most Outstanding Woman in Sport at the Australian Women in Sport Awards.

References

External links

 
 
 
 
 

Female Paralympic swimmers of Australia
Commonwealth Games bronze medallists for Australia
Commonwealth Games silver medallists for Australia
Sportswomen from Victoria (Australia)
Swimmers from Melbourne
Swimmers at the 2008 Summer Paralympics
Swimmers at the 2010 Commonwealth Games
Swimmers at the 2012 Summer Paralympics
Swimmers at the 2016 Summer Paralympics
Swimmers at the 2020 Summer Paralympics
Swimmers at the 2018 Commonwealth Games
Medalists at the 2008 Summer Paralympics
Medalists at the 2012 Summer Paralympics
Medalists at the 2016 Summer Paralympics
Medalists at the 2020 Summer Paralympics
Swimmers at the 2022 Commonwealth Games
Paralympic gold medalists for Australia
Paralympic silver medalists for Australia
Paralympic bronze medalists for Australia
Amputee category Paralympic competitors
Australian amputees
Sportspeople with limb difference
Australian twins
Twin sportspeople
Australian Institute of Sport Paralympic swimmers
Australian female freestyle swimmers
Australian female butterfly swimmers
Australian female backstroke swimmers
Recipients of the Medal of the Order of Australia
1991 births
Living people
S9-classified Paralympic swimmers
Commonwealth Games medallists in swimming
Medalists at the World Para Swimming Championships
Paralympic medalists in swimming
20th-century Australian women
21st-century Australian women
Medallists at the 2010 Commonwealth Games
Medallists at the 2018 Commonwealth Games